Bocourt's tree frog (Dryophytes bocourti), or Bocourt's treefrog, is a species of frog in the family Hylidae endemic to Guatemala and found on the mountains of the southern Alta Verapaz Department and Baja Verapaz Department. It is named after Marie Firmin Bocourt, a French zoologist and artist.

Bocourt's tree frogs have been found in open, grassy meadows that are flooded during the early part of the rainy season, as well as under sheaths of banana plants and in a bromeliad. They appear to tolerate some habitat disturbance. They breed in temporary pools.

The species seems to have undergone a serious decline. This is attributed to pesticide pollution from the ornamental plant industry and, possibly, to chytridiomycosis.

References

Dryophytes
Endemic fauna of Guatemala
Amphibians of Guatemala
Amphibians described in 1899
Taxonomy articles created by Polbot